Rhum agricole is the French term for sugarcane juice rum, a style of rum originally distilled in the French Caribbean islands from freshly squeezed sugarcane juice rather than molasses. Rhum is the term that typically distinguishes it in French-speaking locales from the rum made with molasses in other parts of the West Indies (Rum, Ron).

Overview
Cane juice rum mostly comes from Haiti, Martinique, and the Guadeloupe islands of Marie-Galante, Grande-Terre, and Basse-Terre, but is made throughout the Caribbean, including on Trinidad, Panama, the Dominican Republic and Grenada, in the Indian Ocean on Mauritius and Réunion Island, and in the Pacific Ocean on the islands of Hawaii.

Most rum is made from molasses, a byproduct of sugar refining. When France began to make sugar from sugar beets around 1811, sugar prices dropped and the debt-ridden sugar factories in the French Caribbean could not survive solely on sugar production. Fresh cane juice was now available for fermenting and distilling into rum.

Martinican producers of cane-juice rums made entirely in Martinique and meeting certain production standards are entitled under French law to the appellation d'origine contrôlée (French protected designation of origin) "AOC Martinique Rhum Agricole." This designation is unique to Martinique and does not define the category of cane juice rum or rhum agricole.

In Martinique, AOC labeled cane juice rums are usually distilled to 70% alcohol (140 proof in the U.S.) and then watered down to 40–55% (80–110 proof) when bottled. It may be aged as little as a few months (3 months at least for AOC Martinique Rhum agricole) or up to a few years.  After three years of aging in oak barrels, it may be called "rhum vieux," or "old rum".

Fourteen distilleries in Martinique produce rhum agricole. They include Habitation Clément in Le Francois, Depaz in Saint-Pierre, and Saint-James Distillery in Sainte-Marie.

The archipelago of Guadeloupe is often listed as one of the best rum destinations, where the rhum is appreciated for its signature flavor. There are nine distilleries in the Guadeloupe Islands and centuries-old traditions in distillation are still used to produce multi-awarded labels. In Basse-Terre you will find Domaine de Severin, Distillerie Bologne, Distillerie Longueteau and Distillerie Reimonenq (where the Musée du Rhum is located). In Grande-Terre there is Distillerie Damoiseau and in Marie-Galante there are Distillerie Bellevue, Distillerie Bielle and Distillerie Poisson (also known as Rhum du Père LaBat).

The rest of the Caribbean produces cane juice rums of varying ages. Most notable are the Barbancourt rums of Haiti which are aged to four, eight and fifteen years. There are five hundred village cottage industry producers of clairin. A form of cane juice rum first appeared in Brazil where it is called Cachaça.

With the burgeoning craft distilling scene, new world styles of rhum agricole are appearing. In Australia, Husk Distillers use local cane varieties, paddock to bottle production and a pot still batch distillation to create a unique Australian expression. Other new world Rhum Agricole distilleries include Chalong Bay and Lamai Distilleries in Thailand and Chamarel in Mauritius. With the closure of Hawaii's crystalline sugar producing mills, some artisanal distilleries have opened which continue production of cane for rhum agricole.

See also 

Cachaça
Clairin
Ti' Punch

References

External links 
 Rhum Agricole at caribbeanspirits.com
 Rhum Agricole at cocktailatlas.com
 Descriptions of Rhum Agricole and Brazilian Cachaca

Rums